Belarus competed at the World Games 2017 in Wroclaw, Poland, from 20 July 2017 to 30 July 2017.

Medalists

Competitors

Gymnastic

Rhythmic Gymnastics
Belarus has qualified at the 2017 World Games:

 Women's individual event - 2 quota

Trampoline
Belarus has qualified at the 2017 World Games:

Men's Individual Tumbling - 1 quota 
Men's Synchronized Trampoline - 1 quota
Women's Synchronized Trampoline - 1 quota

Muaythai
Belarus has qualified at the 2017 World Games:

 Men's -71 kg - 1 quota place (Andrei Kulebin)
 Men's -75 kg - 1 quota place (Vitaly Gurkov)
 Men's -81 kg - 1 quota place (Dmitry Valent)
 Men's -86 kg - 1 quota place (Anatoliy Vanakov)

References 

Nations at the 2017 World Games
2017 in Belarusian sport
Belarus at multi-sport events